Suchodół or Suchodol may refer to the following places:
Suchodół, Piaseczno County in Masovian Voivodeship (east-central Poland)
Suchodół, Płock County in Masovian Voivodeship (east-central Poland)
Suchodół, Sochaczew County in Masovian Voivodeship (east-central Poland)
Suchodół, Węgrów County in Masovian Voivodeship (east-central Poland)
Suchodół, Lubusz Voivodeship (west Poland)
Suchodol, Czech Republic, a village

See also 
 Sukhodol (disambiguation), places in Russia
 Suhodol (disambiguation), places in the Balkans